Elections to Dungannon District Council were held on 17 May 1989 on the same day as the other Northern Irish local government elections. The election used four district electoral areas to elect a total of 22 councillors.

Election results

Note: "Votes" are the first preference votes.

Districts summary

|- class="unsortable" align="centre"
!rowspan=2 align="left"|Ward
! % 
!Cllrs
! % 
!Cllrs
! %
!Cllrs
! %
!Cllrs
! % 
!Cllrs
! % 
!Cllrs
!rowspan=2|TotalCllrs
|- class="unsortable" align="center"
!colspan=2 bgcolor="" | UUP
!colspan=2 bgcolor="" | SDLP
!colspan=2 bgcolor="" | Sinn Féin
!colspan=2 bgcolor="" | DUP
!colspan=2 bgcolor="" |  Workers' Party
!colspan=2 bgcolor="white"| Others
|-
|align="left"|Blackwater
|bgcolor="40BFF5"|49.0
|bgcolor="40BFF5"|3
|17.1
|1
|10.4
|0
|23.5
|1
|0.0
|0
|0.0
|0
|5
|-
|align="left"|Clogher Valley
|bgcolor="40BFF5"|38.5
|bgcolor="40BFF5"|2
|29.5
|1
|16.5
|1
|15.5
|1
|0.0
|0
|0.0
|0
|5
|-
|align="left"|Dungannon Town
|bgcolor="40BFF5"|42.7
|bgcolor="40BFF5"|2
|13.2
|1
|13.7
|0
|14.4
|1
|5.1
|1
|10.9
|1
|6
|-
|align="left"|Torrent
|21.3
|1
|20.1
|2
|bgcolor="#008800"|32.6
|bgcolor="#008800"|2
|0.0
|0
|0.0
|0
|26.0
|1
|6
|- class="unsortable" class="sortbottom" style="background:#C9C9C9"
|align="left"| Total
|37.5
|8
|20.1
|5
|18.7
|3
|13.1
|3
|1.1
|1
|9.5
|2
|22
|-
|}

District results

Blackwater

1985: 3 x UUP, 1 x DUP, 1 x SDLP
1989: 3 x UUP, 1 x DUP, 1 x SDLP
1985-1989 Change: No change

Clogher Valley

1985: 2 x UUP, 1 x SDLP, 1 x Sinn Féin, 1 x DUP
1989: 2 x UUP, 1 x SDLP, 1 x Sinn Féin, 1 x DUP
1985-1989 Change: No change

Dungannon Town

1985: 2 x UUP, 1 x DUP, 1 x SDLP, 1 x Sinn Féin, 1 x Independent Nationalist
1989: 2 x UUP, 1 x DUP, 1 x SDLP, 1 x Workers' Party, 1 x Independent Nationalist
1985-1989 Change: Workers' Party gain from Sinn Féin

Torrent

1985: 2 x Sinn Féin, 2 x SDLP, 1 x UUP, 1 x Independent Nationalist
1989: 2 x Sinn Féin, 2 x SDLP, 1 x UUP, 1 x Independent Nationalist
1985-1989 Change: No change

References

Dungannon and South Tyrone Borough Council elections
Dungannon and South Tyrone